is a public university located in the city of Nagakute, Aichi, Japan. There is a campus in Moriyama-ku, Nagoya which is for the nursing school, namely Aichi Prefectural College of Nursing & Health.  The predecessor of the school was founded in 1947, and it was chartered as a university in 1966.

Rankings

External links
 Official website

Educational institutions established in 1947
Public universities in Japan
Aichi Prefectural University
1947 establishments in Japan
Nagakute, Aichi